The following is a list of computer and video games developed or published by the defunct company HummingBirdSoft.

NEC PC-8801
1984
Abyss
地獄の練習問題
1985
Abyss II: Tears of Emperor
1987
The Stone of Agni
Laplace no Ma ラプラスの魔

NEC PC-88VA
1988
Record of Lodoss War: The Grey Witch

NEC PC-9801
1987
ラプラスの魔
1988
Record of Lodoss War: The Grey Witch
1990
Record of Lodoss War: 福神漬
1991
Record of Lodoss War II: 五色の魔竜
1992
Record of Lodoss War: 福神漬3
Dates Unknown
パラケルススの魔剣

NEC PC-9821
Record of Lodoss War: The Grey Witch

Sharp X68000
1987
ラプラスの魔
1988
Record of Lodoss War: The Grey Witch
1990
Record of Lodoss War: 福神漬
1991
Record of Lodoss War II: 五色の魔竜

Fujitsu FM-7
1983
The Palms
The Knight of Wonderland
1984
Abyss
Recapture
地獄の練習問題
Rock'n Roller
1985
Tape Abyss
Abyss II: Tears of Emperor
1987
ラプラスの魔

Fujitsu FM-8
1983
The Palms
The Knight of Wonderland
1984
Abyss
Recapture
地獄の練習問題
Rock'n Roller
1985
Tape Abyss

Fujitsu FM-77
1983
The Knight of Wonderland
1984
Abyss
地獄の練習問題

Fujitsu FM-77AV
1987
Fire Ball

FM Towns
1994
Record of Lodoss War: The Grey Witch

MSX2
1987
Fire Ball
The Stone of Agni
1988
Record of Lodoss War: The Grey Witch
1990
Record of Lodoss War: Fuku Zinduke

MSX2+
1988
Record of Lodoss War: The Grey Witch

Famicom Disk System
1986
Deep Dungeon: The Heretic War
1987
Deep Dungeon II: The Crest of the Hero

Nintendo Entertainment System
1988
Deep Dungeon III: The Journey to the Hero
1990
Deep Dungeon IV: The Black Sorcerer

Super Nintendo Entertainment System
1995
Laplace no Ma ラプラスの魔
Record of Lodoss War

3DO
1994
Kurokishi no Kamen

HummingBirdSoft